Guangfo Expressway connects the cities of Guangzhou and Foshan in the Guangdong province, China.

References

Expressways in China
Transport in Guangdong